"You're Better Off Dead!" is the first single from the album Hate Crew Deathroll by Children of Bodom. Released in 2002, the single track is the same recording but with a different mix from the album version. The lyrics for the "Somebody Put Something in My Drink" Ramones cover were slightly altered. This cover appeared as the North America bonus track for Are You Dead Yet?, and also appeared as a Japanese bonus track for Hate Crew Deathroll. The single spent two weeks as the best-seller in Finland and was awarded a gold disc.

References

2002 singles
Children of Bodom songs
Spinefarm Records singles
Songs written by Alexi Laiho
2002 songs